Wailea is a census-designated place (CDP) in Maui County, Hawaii, United States. As of the 2020 census, it had a population of 6,027. Prior to 2010, the area was part of the Wailea-Makena census-designated place. The community was developed in 1971 by a partnership of Alexander & Baldwin and Northwestern Mutual.

Geography
Wailea is located at  (20.690104, -156.439108).

Wailea is bordered by Makena to the south, Kihei to the north, the Pacific to the west and Haleakalā to the east.

Wailea has multiple beaches, including Polo, Wailea, Ulua, Mokapu, and Keawakapu.

Demographics

Resorts
Its development is guided by two important documents: a master plan that allegedly ensures low density and good community planning, and the Wailea Community Association's design guidelines which claim to preserve Maui's island environment in all new building projects. Both documents are administered by the Wailea Community Association, which has long combined professional management (since 1984) and volunteer owner control of the Board of Directors (since 1999) to effectively manage the community in a customer service manner for all stakeholders: residents, hotels, commercial owners, and tourists. Wailea was named one of the country's 99 Best Recreational & Residential Private Communities in America. Many of Wailea's single-family and condominium complexes offer gated entryways for enhanced security and privacy. Utilities are buried underground, and roadways are landscaped. Nearby are Wailea's many amenities, including restaurants, championship golf courses, tennis facilities, shopping, and beaches.

Economy
Major employers in Wailea include the Grand Wailea Resort, Four Seasons Resort Maui, Fairmont Kea Lani, Marriott Wailea Beach, the Wailea Golf Club, Wailea Beach Villas, Tommy Bahama, Spago, Polo Beach Club, Wailea Grand Champions, and Destination Residences Hawaii.

History 
Wailea was originally a fishing settlement and its name translates to “water of lea”  the goddess of canoe-builders. Legend has it she transformed the area into a beautiful forest for birds and would frequently fly above it to appreciate its beauty. In ancient Hawaiian times they would settle toward the mountains of Wailea where they grew sweet potatoes (uala) and would venture down to the shore to fish. Great Māhele 

In the past two centuries cattle raising became a mainstay of the economy and led to the formation of places such as Ulupalakua Ranch.

See also
List of beaches in Hawaii#Maui

References

External links

 Daily newspaper
 Wailea Community Association

Census-designated places in Maui County, Hawaii
Populated places on Maui
Populated coastal places in Hawaii
Alexander & Baldwin
Joint ventures